The 122nd Signal Battalion was constituted 1 July 1916 in the United States Regular Army, then organized to Fort Bliss in Texas on 10 October 1916. On 21 September 1917, the unit was assigned to the 2nd Infantry Division.

Campaign Participation Credit  

 Philippine Insurrection: San Isidro
 World War I: Aisne; Aisne-Marne; St. Mihiel; Meuse-Argonne; Lorraine 1918; Ile de France 1918
 World War II: Normandy; Northern France; Rhineland; Ardennes-Alsace; Central Europe
 Korean War: UN Defensive; UN Offensive; CCF Intervention; First UN Counteroffensive; CCF Spring Offensive; UN Summer-Fall Offensive; Second Korean Winter; Korea, Summer-Fall 1952; Third Korean Winter; Korea, Summer 1953

Decorations   

 Presidential Unit Citation (Army) for WIRTZFELD, BELGIUM
 Presidential Unit Citation (Army) for HONGCHON
 Meritorious Unit Commendation (Army) for EUROPEAN THEATER
 Meritorious Unit Commendation (Army) for KOREA 1950-1951
 French Croix de Guerre with Palm, World War I for AISNE-MARNE
 French Croix de Guerre with Palm, World War I for MEUSE-ARGONNE
 French Croix de Guerre, World War I, Fourragere
 Belgian Fourragere 1940
 Cited in the Order of the Day of the Belgian Army for action in the Ardennes
 Cited in the Order of the Day of the Belgian Army for action on Elsenborn Crest
 Republic of Korea Presidential Unit Citation for NAKTONG RIVER LINE
 Republic of Korea Presidential Unit Citation for KOREA 1950-1953

References

Signal battalions of the United States Army
Military units and formations established in 1916